Aulonocara is a genus of haplochromine cichlids endemic to Lake Malawi in East Africa. All Aulonocara species are maternal mouth brooders. Particularly in the aquarium hobby, Aulonocara species are also known as peacock cichlids, aulonocaras or simply "peacocks". This genus is strongly sexually dichromic, even by haplochromine standards.

As aquarium fish, they are best kept with other medium-sized nonaggressive cichlids from Lake Malawi. All peacock cichlids are known to be less aggressive than their Mbuna counterparts, and thrive in warmer waters that have a slightly basic pH.

Species

The 22 recognized species in this genus are: 
 Aulonocara aquilonium Konings, 1995
 Aulonocara auditor (Trewavas, 1935)
 Aulonocara baenschi M. K. Meyer & Riehl, 1985 (nkhomo-benga peacock)
 Aulonocara brevinidus Konings, 1995
 Aulonocara brevirostre (Trewavas, 1935)
 Aulonocara ethelwynnae M. K. Meyer, Riehl & Zetzsche, 1987 (Chitande aulonocara)
 Aulonocara gertrudae Konings, 1995
 Aulonocara guentheri Eccles, 1989
 Aulonocara hansbaenschi M. K. Meyer, Riehl & Zetzsche, 1987 (Fort Maguire aulonocara)
 Aulonocara hueseri M. K. Meyer, Riehl & Zetzsche 1987 (night aulonocara)
 Aulonocara jacobfreibergi (D. S. Johnson, 1974) (Freiberg's peacock, eureka red peacock, fairy cichlid)
 Aulonocara kandeense Tawil & Allgayer, 1987 (blue orchid aulonocara)
 Aulonocara koningsi Tawil, 2003 	
 Aulonocara korneliae M. K. Meyer, Riehl & Zetzsche, 1987 (Chizumulu aulonocara)
 Aulonocara maylandi Trewavas, 1984 (sulfurhead peacock, sulfurhead aulonocara)
 Aulonocara nyassae Regan, 1922 (emperor cichlid)
 Aulonocara rostratum Trewavas, 1935
 Aulonocara saulosi M. K. Meyer, Riehl & Zetzsche, 1987 (greenface aulonocara)
 Aulonocara steveni M. K. Meyer, Riehl & Zetzsche, 1987 (pale Usisya aulonocara)
 Aulonocara stonemani (W. E. Burgess & H. R. Axelrod, 1973)
 Aulonocara stuartgranti M. K. Meyer & Riehl, 1985 (flavescent peacock)
 Aulonocara trematocephala (Boulenger, 1901)

References

External links
 Aulonocara localisations

 
Freshwater fish genera
Cichlid genera

Taxa named by Charles Tate Regan